The 1966 Sheffield City Council elections were held in May, with one third of the council up for election and double vacancies in five wards - Cathedral, Ecclesall, Manor, Tinsley and Woodseats. There were no changes in seats, with overall turnout slumping to a low of 22.5% being the main story of the night.

Election result

The result had the following consequences for the total number of seats on the Council after the elections:

Ward results

References

1966 English local elections
1966
City Council election, 1966
Sheffield City Council election